Liam O'Connor is a multi-instrumentalist musician, once referred to as "the Jimi Hendrix of the accordion".

Early life

Liam O'Connor was born in Newmarket, County Cork, Ireland, to a musical family.  At the age of 10 he joined his family's band, The O'Connor Family.  The band was composed of O'Connor, his three brothers and his three sisters. They travelled the country playing with Comhaltas Ceoltóirí Éireann. He now lives in Killarney, County Kerry.

Music career

O'Connor signed a contract with MCA Universal Music in 1993 and released his debut album The Awakening with vocalist Lisa Aherne. The album was nominated for an IRMA award and caught the attention of Michael Flatley and Lord of the Dance. O'Connor toured with Lord of the Dance for two and a half years.

He is the only Irish musician to be asked to perform at the Ryder Cup twice and performed  at the All-Ireland Football and Hurling Finals in Ireland's National Stadium Croke Pairc seven times.

In 2006 O'Connor recorded the official anthem for the Gaelic Athletic Association (GAA) "Morning Dew" with GAA broadcasting legend Mícheál Ó Muircheartaigh and topped the Irish charts for six weeks.

O'Connor is listed in the Guinness Book of Records in 2008 as having the fastest fingers in the world on the Accordion. He has appeared on numerous television programs including Gay Byrnes The Late Late Show, Kenny Live, RTÉ's Live at 3, Open House, Michael Aspels This Is Your Life, Seoige and O'Shea, Vodafone Allstars, Michael Flatley's tribute on The Late Late Show, Christie Hennessy's TV documentary, RTÉ News, Pat Kenny's Late Late Show, and Ryan Tubridy's Late Late Show.

In 2010 O'Connor released the album Tico Mystico, produced by John Themis.

O'Connor frequently performs at the Killarney Avenue Hotel from May to October in Killarney as the Liam O'Connor Show.

O'Connor also frequently collaborates with local secondary school St. Brendan's College, Killarney.

Personal life 
O'Connor has 3 children.

Discography

Credits

Recognition

References

External links 

 Official website

Living people
Irish accordionists
Irish musicians
People from County Cork
21st-century accordionists
Year of birth missing (living people)